Comparison of GPS software can mean:
 Comparison of satellite navigation software
 Comparison of free off-line satellite navigation software

See also
GPS navigation software